Gary Schwartz (born 1944) is an American psychologist and author.

Gary Schwartz may also refer to:
Gary Schwartz (art historian) (born 1940)
Gary Schwartz (designer), technology entrepreneur and investor
Gary Schwartz (Manitoba politician)
Gary Schwartz, voice actor known for voicing Heavy and Demoman in Team Fortress 2, among other roles